The 2013–14 Montana Lady Griz basketball team represents the University of Montana during the 2013–14 NCAA Division I women's basketball season. The Lady Griz, led by thirty-sixth year head coach Robin Selvig, play their home games at Dahlberg Arena and were members of the Big Sky Conference. They finish the season 23–11, 14–6 in Big Sky play to finish in third place. They advance to the championship game of the 2014 Big Sky Conference women's basketball tournament where they lost to North Dakota. They were invited to the Women's National Invitation Tournament where they defeated Washington State in the first round before losing to San Diego in the second round.

Before the Season

Departures

New Additions
4 members signed letters-of-intent to join the Lady Griz team for the 2013-14 season.

Roster

Schedule
Source 

|-
!colspan=9 style="background:#660033; color:#999999;"| Exhibition

|-
!colspan=9 style="background:#660033; color:#999999;"| Regular Season

|-
!colspan=9 style="background:#660033; color:#848482;"| 2014 Big Sky tournament

|-
!colspan=9 style="background:#660033; color:#848482;"| 2014 WNIT

See also
2013–14 Montana Grizzlies basketball team

References

Montana Lady Griz basketball seasons
Montana
2014 Women's National Invitation Tournament participants
Lady
Lady